APOEL Volleyball Club is a professional volleyball team based in the city of Nicosia, Cyprus and it is a part of the APOEL multi-sport club.

History
APOEL was formed in 1926, but the volleyball team was formed in 1928. APOEL was also a founding member of the Cyprus Volleyball Federation.

The volleyball team of APOEL won 11 championships (4 held by the Cypriot Local Committee for Sports and 7 held by the Cyprus Volleyball Federation) and 5 Cups. The 1980s was the most successful decade for the team, winning 6 Championships and 5 Cups between 1979 and 1985. Also, the decade of the 1990s was amazing for the youth teams of APOEL (U15, U17, U21) by winning 16 trophies in just 7 years.

Since then, the team had some good seasons with participation in 2003–04 CEV Top Teams Cup and 2004–05 CEV Cup, but without any title outcome. In the 2008–09 season APOEL relegated to the Second Division and suspended its activities due to financial difficulties. That was the first and only time which a team from APOEL multisport club was relegated.

In season 2012–13, the volleyball club of APOEL was reactivated and participated in the Cypriot Second Division. They became champions by winning all their league matches (15 wins out of 15 matches) and promoted to the Cypriot First Division for the 2013–14 season.

In 2018–19 APOEL has reached again to the top clubs of Cyprus by qualifying both to the cup final 4 and championship playoffs while finishing 3rd in the championship while almost reached playoffs finals although lost in the semifinals series with Pafiakos by 4-3 (Pafiakos started having a 2-0 handicap from the regular season)

Current squad
As of: 15 September 2022

League Positions

Honours
 Cypriot Championship
 Winners (11): 1953–54, 1968–69, 1969–70, 1970–71, 1971–72, 1978–79, 1979–80, 1980–81, 1982–83, 1983–84, 1984–85

 Cypriot Cup
 Winners (5): 1978–79, 1980–81, 1981–82, 1983–84, 1984–85

Cypriot Second Division
 Winners (1): 2012–13

 Youth trophies (16):
 U21: 3 Championships (1991–92, 1992–93, 1995–96)  2 Cups (1994–95, 1995–96)
 U18: 5 Championships (1990–91, 1992–93, 1993–94, 1995–96, 1996–97)
 U16: 6 Championships (1988–89, 1990–91, 1992–93, 1993–94, 1994–95, 1995–96)

Women's team

History
APOEL women's volleyball team was formed in 1974. The women's team won their only title in 1977, when they managed to win AEL Limassol 3–2 in the season's Cup final. The team suspended its operation in 1990, due to financial problems.

League Positions

Honours
 Women's Cup
 Winners (1): 1976–77

References

External links
 APOEL Athletic Football Club – official website 

 
Volleyball
Volleyball clubs in Cyprus